Travis Edward Dorsch (born September 4, 1979) is a former American college and professional football player turned academic who was placekicker and punter in the National Football League (NFL) for two seasons during the early 2000s.  He played college football for Purdue University, and was recognized as a consensus All-American.  The Cincinnati Bengals picked him in the fourth round of the 2002 NFL Draft, and he played professionally for the Bengals and Green Bay Packers of the NFL, and the Rhein Fire of NFL Europa.

Early years
Dorsch was born in San Diego, California.  He attended Bozeman High School in Bozeman, Montana, and was a letterman in high school football, basketball, and track and field for the Bozeman Hawks.  He also played four years of American Legion baseball for the Bozeman Bucks as a starting first baseman and pitcher.  He holds several state records including the longest field goal in state history (fifth-longest in the national high school annals) at 63 yards.

College career
While attending Purdue University in West Lafayette, Indiana, Dorsch played for both the Purdue Boilermakers football team and the Boilermakers baseball team.  While playing for the Boilermakers football team from 1998 to 2001, Dorsch set many records including career scoring (355 points), career field goals (69), and career punting average (48.4).  He became the first Big Ten Conference athlete to be named as a first-team all-conference selection as both a punter and a placekicker.  He was recognized as a consensus first-team All-American punter, having received first-team honors from the American Football Coaches Association, Associated Press, Walter Camp Foundation and CNNSI.  He also and won the Ray Guy Award for the nation's outstanding punter, and received first-team All-American honors as a placekicker from Football News and The Sporting News.  He is the only athlete in Purdue history to have kicked a field goal and thrown a touchdown in football, and hit a home run and recorded a win as a pitcher in baseball.

Professional career
As a football player, Dorsch was drafted in the fourth round (111th overall pick) in the 2002 NFL Draft by the Cincinnati Bengals. His only NFL experience came with the Bengals in 2002. He had 5 punts, averaging just 32.4 as an injury replacement for starter Nick Harris. Dorsch was a member of the 2004 Green Bay Packers playoff roster and was a practice squad member with the Minnesota Vikings in 2004.  He spent 2005 and 2006 competing in NFL Europe as a punter for the Rhein Fire in Düsseldorf, Germany.

Life after football
Dorsch is currently an associate professor at Utah State University in Logan, Utah. He pursued graduate studies at Purdue and completed his doctorate in Sports and Exercise Psychology in 2013. After retiring from football in 2006, he has focused his competitive energies on the sport of triathlon and has finished nine Ironman races worldwide.

As a professor, Dorsch is the founding director of the Families in Sport Lab at Utah State University and has published more than 30 scholarly articles, all of which can be downloaded on his lab's website: .

References

1979 births
Living people
American football placekickers
American football punters
Cincinnati Bengals players
Green Bay Packers players
Minnesota Vikings players
New England Patriots players
New York Giants players
Purdue Boilermakers baseball players
Purdue Boilermakers football players
Rhein Fire players
All-American college football players
Utah State University faculty
Sportspeople from Bozeman, Montana
Players of American football from Montana
Players of American football from San Diego